Ridnitšohkka is the second-highest point in Finland, though it is the highest mountain with its peak within Finland. The eastern face is steep while the western side is mild. While somewhat popular destination among off-piste skiers, the remoteness ( from the nearest settlement) of this mountain makes it very isolated. The mast on the top is for telecommunications, so the emergency services are somewhat available there, which is not true for many other locations in the area.

Ridnitšohkka has the most extensive area of permanent snow in Finland. However, during the past years the size of the snowfield has considerably diminished.

References

External links 
 

Enontekiö
Mountains of Finland
One-thousanders of Finland
Scandinavian Mountains